Delta Aurigids, or DAU is a minor reliable meteor shower that takes place from October 10 to 18. The peak of the shower is on October 11, with two meteors per hour. The velocity is 143,000 mph.

References

External links 

http://www.imo.net/calendar/
http://www.amsmeteors.org/showers.html#2009

Meteor showers
September events
October events